USS YF-445 was an American YF-257-class covered lighter built in 1943 for service in World War II. She was later acquired by the United States Coast Guard and renamed USCGC White Heath (WAGL-545).

Construction and career 
YF-445 was laid down by the Erie Concrete & Steel Supply Co., in Erie, Pennsylvania on 4 June 1943. She was launched on 21 July 1943.  She was commissioned on 9 August 1944, with a single mast and boom hoist. 

On 9 August 1947 she was formally commissioned as a Coast Guard cutter and was christened White Heath and given the hull designation WAGL-545. She was then sent to the Coast Guard Yard for conversion to a buoy tender. Her deck arrangement was converted to include a large derrick to handle buoys and her upper deck was extended.

She was stationed throughout her Coast Guard career at Boston.  Her primary assignment was to tend aids to navigation although she was called upon to conduct other traditional Coast Guard duties, such as search and rescue, law enforcement or light icebreaking duties, as required.  

From 4 to 5 October 1960, she assisted after an Eastern Air Lines Flight 375 near Boston.

She was decommissioned on 31 March 1998 and was transferred to Tunisia in 1998 who commissioned her Turgueness (A-805) on 10 June 1998.

Awards 

 American Campaign Medal 
 World War II Victory Medal
 National Defense Service Medal

References

 This article contains public domain text from the United States Coats Guard Historian’s Office website.
http://www.uscg.mil/history/WEBCUTTERS/NPS_133_HAER_Report.pdf
 Cutter History File.  USCG Historian's Office, USCG HQ, Washington, D.C.
 Robert Scheina.  U.S. Coast Guard Cutters & Craft, 1946–1990.  Annapolis, MD: Naval Institute Press, 1990.
 U. S. Department of the Interior.  National Park Service. U.S. Coast Guard  Buoy Tenders.  HAER booklet.  Washington, DC: National Park Service, February, 2004.  [ HAER no. DC-57; Todd Croteau, HAER Industrial Archeologist (project leader); Jet Low, HAER Photographer; Mark Porter, NCSHPO Consultant (historian), and Candace Clifford, booklet design. ]

External links 

 NavSource Online: White Heath (WLM-545)
 United States Coast Guard: White Heath, 1947
 TogetherWeServed: White Heath Crew Members

White-class coastal buoy tenders
1943 ships
Ships built in Erie, Pennsylvania
World War II auxiliary ships of the United States
Ships transferred from the United States Navy to the United States Coast Guard
Ships transferred from the United States Coast Guard to other navies